Christian Gottlob Steinmüller (25 September 1792 – 8 May 1864) was an organ builder in Germany.

Life

He was born on 25 September 1792, the son of Johann Gottlob Steinmüller in Arnoldsgrün, in the Electorate of Saxony. On 15 January 1806, he began a 6-year apprenticeship with his uncle, Johann Gottlob Trampeli.

On completion of his apprenticeship he settled in Grünhainer Hospitalgasse and founded his own organ building business.

He married Wilhelmine Friedericke Hilliger.

Work
According to his own records in his 52-year career he built at least 27 organs in the following locations.

 1812: Grünhain
 1813: Großzöbern
 1817/1818: St.-Bartholomäus-Kirche (Wolkenstein)
 1819/1820: Church in Gornsdorf
 1820/1821: St. Johannis in Lößnitz (Erzgebirge)
 1823: St.-Jakobi-Kirche in Oelsnitz/Erzgeb.
 1824/1825: Church in Drebach
 1827: Churches in  Seifersbach und in Hormersdorf
 1827/1828: Wehrgangkirche in Großrückerswalde
 1828/1829: Church in Ursprung
 1830: Church in Mildenau
 1831: St. Michaeliskirche in Pausa/Vogtl.
 1831: Church in Reinsberg
 1832–1834: Church in Colmberg
 1835/1836: Church in Arnoldsgrün
 1837: Church in Schwarzbach (Elterlein)
 1837/1838: St.-Laurentius-Kirche in Crimmitschau
 1839: Church in Griesbach (Schneeberg)
 1840/1841: Church in Thierfeld
 1841/1842: St. Katharinen Church in Oelsnitz/Vogtl.
 1842/1843: Church in Waldenburg (Sachsen)
 1843: Church in Pfannenstiel
 1844: St.-Jakobi-Kirche Mülsen
 1845: Church in St. Egidien
 1846/1847: Church in Auerbach (Erzgebirge)
 1848: Allerheiligenkirche (Raschau)

References

1792 births
1864 deaths
People from Vogtlandkreis
People from the Electorate of Saxony
German Lutherans
German pipe organ builders
Pipe organ building companies
Manufacturing companies established in 1812
Musical instrument manufacturing companies of Germany
19th-century Lutherans